SkyStar Airways Co., Ltd, operating as SkyStar Airways, was an airline based in Bangkok, Thailand.

SkyStar Airways had 250 employees (2009).
SkyStar Airways ceased operations on 3 January 2009 after not paying staff salaries for six months after September 2008.

Destinations 
SkyStar Airways served the following destinations (at July 2009):

Asia 
People's Republic of China
Chengdu – Chengdu Shuangliu International Airport [Seasonal]
Chongqing – Chongqing Jiangbei International Airport [Seasonal]
Harbin – Harbin Taiping International Airport [Seasonal]
Nanning – Nanning Wuxu Airport [Seasonal]
South Korea
Busan – Gimhae International Airport
Seoul – Incheon International Airport
Thailand
Bangkok – Suvarnabhumi Airport Hub
Chiang Mai – Chiang Mai International Airport [Seasonal]
Phuket – Phuket International Airport Focus City
Surat Thani – Surat Thani Airport [Seasonal]

Fleet 
The SkyStar Airways fleet consisted of the following aircraft (at 8 July 2009):

References

External links 

 
SkyStar Airways aircraft
SkyStar Airways fleet

Defunct airlines of Thailand
Airlines established in 2007
Airlines disestablished in 2009
Companies based in Bangkok
Thai companies established in 2007
2009 disestablishments in Thailand